Welwalo Adigrat University Sport Club (Amharic: ወልዋሎ ዓዲግራት ዩኒቨርሲቲ ስፖርት ክለብ) is an Ethiopian football club based in Adigrat, Ethiopia. They play in the Ethiopian Premier League, the top division of Ethiopian football.

History 
Welwalo Adigrat University FC was founded in 1948 as Wolwalo F.c and participated in different Ethiopian league ranks. Wolwalo was promoted to the Ethiopian Premier League for the first time after the end of the 2016–17 season. Welwalo Adigrat is funded as part of Adigrat University, a public institution.

The club began as the official football team of Adigrat University, called themselves Welwalo, and competing in gold and black colors. The Welwalo initially participated in Group A of the Higher league (also known as the Ethiopian Super League), the second tier of Ethiopian football, before being promoted to the Ethiopian Premier League after the 2016–17 season.

Ethiopian Premier League 
After a slow start to the season falling to 10th place in the premier league, the team sacked their manager Berhane GebreEgziabher. Former Arba Minch manager Tsegaye Kidanemariam was hired in his place. In a match versus Fasil Kenema (K/Mariam's first match as manager), the Welwalo goalkeeper Zewedu Mesfin gained much attention for an infamous play in which he accidentally threw the ball into his own net. The own goal ended being the deciding factor in the match with Welwalo dropping all 3 points in 1–0 scoreline.

On April 30, 2018 the club was involved in an altercation during a game against Defense Force S.C. that ultimately led to a member of the Welwalo coaching staff physically attacking the referee. Although all involved avoided serious injury after altercation the incident prompted the Ethiopian Football Federation to suspend the entire league upon further review of the situation, calling for an emergency meeting for the following Thursday.

Grounds 
Welwalo Adigrat University FC plays its home games at Adigrat Stadium in the city of Adigrat in the northern Tigray Region of Ethiopia. Notably the field they play on was grass-less during their inaugural 2017–18 Ethiopian Premier League season. In August 2018, it was announced that Adigrat Stadium would undergo renovations which would install a new grass field as well as new seating in the stands.

Derby 
The club plays in the Tigray derby with fellow Tigray Region club Mekelle 70 Enderta FC. The derby enjoys relatively large attendances.

Former Managers 
  Berhane GebreEgziabher
  Tsegaye Kidanemariam
  Yohannes Sahle

Players

First-team squad 
As of 12 January 2020

References 

Football clubs in Ethiopia
Association football clubs disestablished in 2011
University and college association football clubs
Sport in Tigray Region
Adigrat